Helianthus laciniatus is a North American species of sunflower known by the common name alkali sunflower. It is found in the southwestern United States (southeastern Arizona, southern New Mexico, western Texas) and north-central Mexico (Chihuahua, Coahuila, Nuevo León, Durango). It is fairly common in the Chihuahuan Desert.

Helianthus laciniatus is a perennial herb up to 200 cm (almost 7 feet) tall. Most of the leaves are on the stem rather than clumped together close to the ground, each leaf is up to 9 cm (2.7 inches) long. One plant usually produces 1-9 flower heads. Each head has with 14–20 yellow ray florets surrounding 40 or more red or purple disc florets. The plant grows in dry, alkaline desert soils.

References

External links
Photo of herbarium specimen collected in Nuevo León in 1989

laciniatus
Flora of the Southwestern United States
Flora of Mexico
Plants described in 1849